Mehama is a village in Saaremaa Parish, Saare County in western Estonia.

Before the administrative reform in 2017, the village was in Orissaare Parish.

Population 
According to http://citypopulation.de/en/estonia/saare/saaremaa/4855__mehama/, the population of Mehama is 31 as of the 31/12/2021 census.

References 

Villages in Saare County